Anne Billson (born 1954) is a writer, photographer, and film critic who was born in Southport, England. Her fiction is characterized by the combination of horror with satire and includes the novels Suckers (1993), Stiff Lips (1997), The Ex (2012). In 2019, she self-published a fantasy novel, Blood Pearl. Granta named Billson one of the "Best Young British Novelists" in 1993.

Billson was the film critic of The Sunday Telegraph (1992–2001) and Today (1986). She has written film reviews for Time Out, Tatler (1989–90), and the New Statesman & Society (1991–92). Billson has written several volumes of nonfiction, including monographs on movies such as John Carpenter's The Thing and Tomas Alfredson's Let the Right One In. Her 2017 book Cats on Film claims to be "the definitive work of feline film scholarship."

In 2015, she was chosen by the British Film Institute as one of “25 Female Film Critics Worth Celebrating.” She has lived in London, Tokyo, Paris, Croydon, and Brussels and now lives in Antwerp.

References

External links
 Anne Billson articles at The Arts Desk
 Anne Billson on the BFI website
 Anne Billson articles on The Guardian website
 Anne Billson articles on The Telegraph website
 Anne Billson articles on The Telegraph website (alternate)

1954 births
Living people
British film critics
British women film critics
British writers
British women writers